Kamkuiyeh (also Romanized as Kamkū’īyeh; also known as Kamgu’iyeh and Kemkūh) is a village in Asfyj Rural District, Asfyj District, Behabad County, Yazd Province, Iran. At the 2006 census, its population was 190, in 50 families.

References 

Populated places in Behabad County